Giovanni Pietro Possenti (1618–1659) was an Italian painter of the Baroque period, active mainly as a battle painter. He was the son and pupil of Benedetto Possenti, who also was known as a painter of battle scenes.

References

1618 births
1659 deaths
Italian Baroque painters
17th-century Italian painters
Italian male painters
Painters from Bologna
Italian battle painters